Heung Fan Liu New Village, also referred to as Heung Fan Liu Resite Area, is a village in Tai Wai, Sha Tin District, Hong Kong.

Location
Heung Fan Liu New Village is located near the Tai Wai Nullah, north of Mei Tin Estate and east of the Lower Shing Mun Reservoir.

Administration
Heung Fan Liu Resite Area is a recognized village under the New Territories Small House Policy.

See also
 Sha Kok (constituency)

References

Villages in Sha Tin District, Hong Kong
Tai Wai